The  QLZ-87 (also known as Type 87) 35 mm automatic grenade launcher (AGL) is an air-cooled, gas operated fully automatic weapon and is crew transportable (12~20 kg) with limited amounts of ammunition. Unusual for handheld grenade launchers, the QLZ-87 fires 35x32 mmSR high-velocity grenades, which provides longer range and flatter firing trajectory.

The QLZ-87 is being complemented by the QLZ-04, which is fed from a belt and thus is better suited to be mounted on tripods and vehicles.

Development

The Chinese military began research into grenade launchers during the 1980s. They started off by examining American weapons captured in the Vietnam War including the 40×46mm single-shot M79 and M203. They were also familiar with the hand-cranked Mk 18, as well as the 40×53mm XM75 and Mk 19. China also obtained samples of the Soviet 30×29mm AGS-17 captured by the Mujahideen during the Soviet–Afghan War.

The Hua Dong Industrial Academy’s Mechanical Research Institute, a state-controlled civilian organization that carried out China's AGL development, concluded that such foreign weapons were too large and heavy to be man-portable and did not fit within doctrinal deployment plans for the system. They also had problems with each sides' ammunition; the U.S. grenade's advanced primer ignition (API) operating principle was less reliable than desired, and the Soviet grenade was too small to contain an effective high-explosive anti-tank (HEAT) warhead, so the team compromised on a 35 mm cartridge.

After five generations of prototypes, the team created a design designated the W87. The W87 featured a roller-delayed blowback operation and fired from a closed bolt for better accuracy. It could be top-loaded from 6- and 9-round box magazines or a 12-round drum magazine. A bipod was included for quick deployment and it could be tripod-mounted. The 35×32mm grenades had an aluminum case and round nose. The W87 and its ammunition were revealed in a presentation at a small arms development conference hosted at Aberdeen Proving Ground in September 1988. After some redesigns, the AGL was accepted into Chinese military service as the QLZ-87 in the mid-1990s.

Design

The QLZ-87 is in fact a derivative of the Type 85 heavy machine gun, featuring a similar tubular steel receiver, direct gas impingement operation, and flap locks (derived from the Degtyarov-Shpagin system featured on the DShK machine gun). It is magazine-fed from 6- or 15-round drums from the bottom; in order to make room for ammunition to be fed from the bottom, the fire selector controls are mounted on the right side and offer safe, semi-automatic, and automatic firing modes.

Its carrying handle is an external part of the bolt group, which is cycled by redirected propellant gas as part of the operating system, but unlike the M16 rifle propellant gasses are not vented into the receiver; it also functions as the charging handle and forward assist.

Once the bolt group starts to recoil, remaining gasses are immediately vented outward, and spent cases are ejected directly upwards. To manage recoil the weapon has a large, twin-port muzzle brake, thick rubber butt pad, and an internal buffer to the rear of the bolt group, but recoil is still harsh and only semi-automatic fire is viable when not mounted.

While American and Russian AGLs are heavy, crew-served tripod-mounted weapons employed at battalion-level, the QLZ-87 in its "light" configuration can be used by one soldier from the shoulder or bipod as a company-level support weapon. In this configuration, it is typically fired semi-automatically and fed from the 6-round drum. In its "heavy" configuration (which includes the tripod) it is carried by a crew of three and can make effective use of the 15-round drum and fully automatic fire. Like heavier AGLs it can be pintle-mounted on vehicles, but troop feedback indicates mounted magazine reloading is both difficult, and frequent because of the low ammunition capacity.

Ammunition
The 35×32mm grenade was also redesigned for the QLZ-87, giving it a shorter overall length with a tapered, flat-nosed projectile housed in a semi-rimmed aluminum case.

The two most common types of grenades are the DFS87 high explosive (HE), which has a fragmentation warhead with a casualty radius of 10–11 meters, and the DFJ87 high explosive dual purpose (HEDP), which has a shaped charge warhead that can penetrate 80 mm of rolled homogeneous armor (RHA) which striking flat or 35 mm of RHA at a 60° angle with a secondary 5-meter fragmentation casualty radius. Although both these rounds have better anti-personnel and armor-piercing effects individually than U.S. 40 mm HEDP, their specialization makes them less suited for defeating a different target set, so ammunition type would have to be changed to effectively engage a different target type.

Initial production of both models featured a fragmentation liner consisting of small steel balls suspended in a polymer matrix, but later the HE projectile used a pre-fragmented wire coil jacket and the HEDP projectile used a steel upper casing to produce fragments, both for cost savings. They have an inertia-armed fuze in the nose permitting a safe arming distance of 12–30 meters from the muzzle. Other available 35 mm cartridges include the DFR87 incendiary, DFN87 high-explosive incendiary (HEI), and DFD87 smoke.

The list of warhead types that are available for the 35x32 mm Type 87:
 DFS-87: Anti-personnel fragmentation grenade with HE-Frag warhead.
 DFJ-87: Dual purpose, Armor-piercing grenade with HEAT warhead.
 DFR-87: Incendiary grenade.
 DFN-87: High-explosive fragmentation incendiary grenade.
 DFD-87: Smoke/marker grenade, with colored smoke.

Variants
 QLZ-87B/QLB-06: A newer handheld semi-automatic version of the QLZ-87. It features an aluminum receiver, redesigned action, new bipod, no tripod mount, and a conventional pistol grip and fire control.

Users
 
 
 : People's Liberation Army
  Some locally made
 : Kurdish Peshmerga
 
 
 : Used by Pakistan Army.
 , some captured by the Shabaab.
 : Known to be made as "ABBA" by MIC. The QLZ-87 is also used by Sudan-backed Chadian rebels and the Sudan People's Liberation Movement-North.

See also

QLZ-04
QLU-11, the replacement of the QLZ-87
Type 91 grenade launcher

International:
Milkor MGL
Neopup PAW-20
Mk 19 grenade launcher
Mk 47 Mod 0 Striker
AGS-17
AGS-30

References

External links
sinodefence.com

Cold War weapons of China
Grenade launchers of the People's Republic of China
Automatic grenade launchers
Military equipment introduced in the 1980s
Norinco